Ohno Dam is an earthfill dam located in Yamanashi Prefecture in Japan. The dam is used for power production. The catchment area of the dam is 487.9 km2. The dam impounds about 15  ha of land when full and can store 1692 thousand cubic meters of water. The construction of the dam was started on 1910 and completed in 1914.

References

Dams in Yamanashi Prefecture
1914 establishments in Japan